Jigsaw is a television crime drama that aired as an element of the wheel series The Men, part of the ABC network's 1972-73 lineup. Universal Television produced Jigsaw; the same studio had previously been responsible for a series which, in part, inspired The Men: The NBC Mystery Movie.

Overview
The program starred James Wainwright as Lt. Frank Dain, who worked as an investigator for the California State Police Department's Bureau of Missing Persons.  Dain was a rebel who chafed at standard police procedures and techniques, but was always effective in finding the person for whom he was searching.  He pieced each case together as if it were a jigsaw puzzle. Shortly before the series' cancellation, Dain was booted from the bureau and set up shop as a private eye.

Episodes

References

External links
 
 

American Broadcasting Company original programming
1970s American crime drama television series
1972 American television series debuts
1973 American television series endings
Television series by Universal Television
English-language television shows
Television shows set in California